The Cactus Press-Plaza Paint Building is a historic building with an arcada in Yuma, Arizona. It was built in 1927, and designed in the Spanish Colonial Revival architectural style. It is "the only single story arcaded, poured concrete commercial structure extant in the Main Street area," and the style is typical of traditional shopping arcades in the Southwestern United States. The structure has been listed on the National Register of Historic Places since April 24, 1987.

References

Buildings and structures in Yuma, Arizona
National Register of Historic Places in Yuma County, Arizona
Shopping arcades in the United States
Spanish Colonial Revival architecture in Arizona